Gazan Bazin may refer to:
 Gazan Bazin, Hormozgan
 Gazan Bazin, Sistan and Baluchestan